Live Bogotá, is the first live album by Colombian musician Fonseca. It features his "Gratitour" last performance from the August 15th concert at the Nemesio Camacho Stadium in Bogotá, Colombia. The album was released on November 16, 2010 on two different formats including a live CD/DVD and digital download.

Track listing

Release history

References

External links 
 Live Bogotá at Amazon

Fonseca (singer) live albums
2010 live albums
2010 video albums
Live video albums
Spanish-language live albums